Stabskorporal  will be the highest enlisted rank in the German Bundeswehr, that might be comparable to (senior) corporal (OR-4) in Anglophone armed forces. However, as distinguished from the corporal in Anglophone armed forces, the Stabskorporal belongs to the rank group of enlisted men.

History 
The ranks Korporal and Stabskorporal were introduced by Bundeswehr in October 2021 as the new most senior ranks for enlisted men, senior to Oberstabsgefreiter. Pay grade of Stabskorporal is A6 mit Zulage (with extra pay), that is the same pay grade as the NCO rank Stabsunteroffizier (OR-5).

Soldiers have to have served for at least one year in the rank of Korporal before being considered for promotion.

References 

Military ranks of Germany